Alberta Provincial Highway No. 55, commonly referred to as Highway 55, is a  long east–west highway in northeast Alberta, Canada.  It extends from the Saskatchewan border in the east through the Cold Lake, Lac La Biche, and Athabasca where it ends at Highway 2.  In Saskatchewan, it continues as Saskatchewan Highway 55.

The entire length of Highway 55 comprises the easternmost segment of Alberta's portion of the Northern Woods and Water Route (NWWR).  West of Athabasca, the Northern Woods and Water Route continues westward along Highway 2 and then Highway 49.

History 
In 1973, Alberta established its secondary highway system along mostly existing unimproved roads, with Secondary Highway 662 running between Highway 36 and Cold Lake, and Secondary Highway 664 running between Athabasca and Donatville.

The idea of a northern highway corridor between Dawson Creek, British Columbia and Winnipeg, Manitoba was originally lobbied by George Stevenson, a retired CN employee who lived in McLennan, Alberta. The communities along the proposed corridor supported his idea and eventually resulted in the incorporation of the Northern Woods and Water Route Association in the western provinces 1974. Highway 55 was paved throughout the 1980s.

Former Highways

Major intersections 
From west to east:

References

External links 

 Northern Woods and Water Route

055
Northern Woods and Water Route
Athabasca, Alberta
Cold Lake, Alberta